Project Manager Mission Command (or PM MC) is a component of Program Executive Office Command, Control and Communications-Tactical in the United States Army. PM MC develops, deploys and sustains integrated Mission Command software capabilities for the Army and Joint forces.  PM MC’s support ensures tactical and other unit types are efficiently fielded, effectively trained, and professionally supported. Product lines include the areas of maneuver, fires, sustainment, and infrastructure.

Mission statement
"To provide intuitive, adaptive mission command and situational awareness capabilities for the command post and platform that enable mission execution by commanders and leaders at all levels to be more effective, agile and decisive."

History

About PM MC 

"PM MC delivers capabilities across the warfighting functions of movement and maneuver, command and control, fires, sustainment, protection, intelligence, and engagement. Implementing the Army’s Common Operating Environment, PM MC fields the Command Post Computing Environment (CP CE) and, the Mounted Computing Environment (MCE) while facilitating interoperability between CP CE, MCE, and other CEs. PM MC uses an agile development process to achieve both near-term deliveries to current systems and longer-term development to enhance mission command capabilities."

PM Battle Command

PM Mission Command

Merge with Project Manager JBC-P
In May 2014, Project Manager Mission Command merged with Project Manager Joint Battle Command-Platform (PM JBC-P) under Mission Command. PdM JBC-P transitioned into a subordinate product of PM MC.

Col. Michael Thurston, the former project manager for PM JBC-P, assumed command of PM MC. The combined organization i consolidate and simplify the many different digital systems that the military uses.

PM MC organization 
PM MC's product offices are Tactical Mission Command (TMC), Fire Support Command and Control (FSC2), Joint Battle Command-Platform (JBC-P), Strategic Mission Command (SMC), Tactical Digital Media (TDM), and Command Post Computing Environment (CP CE).
 Tactical Mission Command provides the Army’s core mission command and collaborative environment and maneuver applications, which include Command Post of the Future (CPOF),  Command Web, and Common Tactical Vision (CTV)
 Fire Support Command and Control provides lethal and non-lethal fires through products including Advanced Field Artillery Tactical Data System (AFATDS), Joint Automated Deep Operations Coordination System (JADOCS), Pocket-Sized Forward Entry Device (PFED), Lightweight Forward Entry Device (LFED), CENTAUR (Lightweight Technical Fire Direction System) and Gun Display Unit-Replacement (GDU-R)
 Joint Battle Command-Platform
 Strategic Mission Command provides operational and strategic tools through products including Battle Command Common Services (BCCS), Global Command and Control System-Army (GCCS-A), Common Software, Joint Convergence/Multilateral Interoperability Program (MIP), Battle Command and Staff Training (BCST), and Tactical Edge Data Solutions Joint Capability Technology Demonstration (TEDS JCTD).
 Tactical Digital Media
 Command Post Computing Environment

Alternate definitions
The Army’s framework for exercising mission command is the operations process-the major mission command activities performed during operations: planning, preparing, executing, and continuously assessing the operation.

The concept of mission command is to help Army forces function effectively and accomplish missions. The Army’s primary mission is to organize, train, and equip forces to conduct prompt sustained land combat operations.

References

External links

 PM MC Public Site

Research installations of the United States Army
Military installations in Maryland
Commands of the United States Army
Military acquisition
United States defense procurement
Command and control systems of the United States military